The Army Nurses Memorial by Bela Pratt is installed at the Massachusetts State House, in Boston, Massachusetts, United States.

Description and history
The bronze sculpture depicts a nurse offering water to a soldier, and rests on a granite base. An inscription on the front of the base reads: .

References

1910s establishments in Massachusetts
1910s sculptures
Bronze sculptures in Massachusetts
Cultural depictions of nurses
Granite sculptures in Massachusetts
Monuments and memorials in Boston
Sculptures of men in Massachusetts
Sculptures of women in Massachusetts
Statues in Boston
Union (American Civil War) monuments and memorials in Massachusetts